Veena (4 July 1926 – 14 November 2004), also known as Veena Kumari, real name Tajour Sultana, was an Indian actress.

Early life and background
Veena was born as Tajour Sultana on 4 July 1926 in Quetta, Baluchistan Agency, British India. At some point of time, her family shifted to Lahore and they lived in Lahore. 

She married actor-hero Al Nasir in 1947 in Junagadh and had two children with him. Al Nasir was from a royal family in Bhopal and had already been married, first to actress Meena Shorey and then to Manorama. They both worked together in a few films but their films flopped at the box-office. Al Nasir died in 1957 due to tetanus.

Career
Veena started out playing heroine roles in pre-partition films. She made her debut with Garib and Gawandhi (1942) at around sixteen years of age. Garib was made in Urdu and Gawandhi was made in Punjabi and directed by Mehboob Khan. In Garib, she played the role of Lata and in Gawandhi she played heroine opposite Shyam, who played the hero. She became known for her roles in pre-partition Hindi and Urdu films. Her early years in films came with films such as Najma (1943), Phool (1945) and Humayun (1945). Her last film before the Partition of India was Rajputani (1946), in which she played a supporting role. She decided to remain in India after the partition in 1947, and she acted through the mid-to-late-1940s, 1950s, 1960s, 1970s and early 1980s. She played roles in big productions such as Halaku (1956), Chalti Ka Naam Gaadi (1958), Kaagaz Ke Phool (1959), Taj Mahal (1963),Do Raaste (1969) and Pakeezah (1972). She retired in 1983 after the release of Razia Sultan (1983) in which she played Empress Shah Turkhan.

Death
Veena died in Bombay on 14 November 2004 after 21 years of retirement when she was 78 years old after suffering from a protracted illness. She had appeared in over 70 feature films in a career spanning 41 years (1942 – 1983).

Filmography

References

External links

1926 births
2004 deaths
Actresses in Urdu cinema
Actresses from Lahore
People from Quetta
Actresses in Hindi cinema
Indian film actresses
20th-century Indian actresses